The 2021 Brown Bears football team represented Brown University in the 2021 NCAA Division I FCS football season as a member of the Ivy League. The team was led by second-year head coach James Perry and played its home games at Richard Gouse Field at Brown Stadium. Brown averaged 3,365 fans per game an 11.19% decrease from the previous season.

Season
Quarterback E. J. Perry was awarded the Ivy League Bushnell Cup in December 2021. He was the fifth Brown player to receive the award since it began in 1970. Perry is the nephew of coach James Perry, who received the Bushnell Cup in 1999.

Schedule

References

Brown
Brown Bears football seasons
Brown Bears football